"Nesrećnice nije te sramota" is a single from Serbian and former Yugoslav rock band Riblja Čorba. The single was given as a gift to the buyers of Riblja Čorba 1987 album Ujed za dušu.

B-side features song "Zašto kuće arlauče".

Track listing 
 "Nesrećnice nije te sramota" - 2:42
 "Zašto kuče arlauče" - 3:00

Personnel 
Bora Đorđević - vocal
Miša Aleksić - bass guitar
Vidoja Božinović - guitar
Nikola Čuturilo - guitar
Vicko Milatović - drums

References 
 EX YU ROCK enciklopedija 1960-2006,  Janjatović Petar;  
 Riblja čorba,  Jakovljević Mirko;  

1987 singles
Riblja Čorba songs